Acetyl chloride is an acyl chloride derived from acetic acid. It belongs to the class of organic compounds called acid halides. It is a colorless, corrosive, volatile liquid. Its formula is commonly abbreviated to AcCl.

Synthesis
On an industrial scale, the reaction of acetic anhydride with hydrogen chloride produces a mixture of acetyl chloride and acetic acid:
(CH3CO)2O + HCl  ->  CH3COCl + CH3CO2H

Laboratory routes
Acetyl chloride was first prepared in 1852 by French chemist Charles Gerhardt by treating potassium acetate with phosphoryl chloride.

Acetyl chloride is produced in the laboratory by the reaction of acetic acid with chlorodehydrating agents such as phosphorus trichloride, phosphorus pentachloride, sulfuryl chloride, phosgene, or thionyl chloride. However, these methods usually give acetyl chloride contaminated by phosphorus or sulfur impurities, which may interfere with the organic reactions.

Other methods
When heated, a mixture of dichloroacetyl chloride and acetic acid gives acetyl chloride.  It can also be synthesized from the catalytic carbonylation of methyl chloride.  It also arises from the reaction of acetic acid, acetonitrile, and hydrogen chloride.

Occurrence
Acetyl chloride is not expected to exist in nature, because contact with water would hydrolyze it into acetic acid and hydrogen chloride. In fact, if handled in open air it releases white "smoke" resulting from hydrolysis due to the moisture in the air. The smoke is actually small droplets of hydrochloric acid and acetic acid formed by hydrolysis.

Uses
Acetyl chloride is used for acetylation reactions, i.e., the introduction of an acetyl group.  Acetyl is an acyl group having the formula ).  For further information on the types of chemical reactions compounds such as acetyl chloride can undergo, see acyl halide. Two major classes of acetylations include esterification and the Friedel-Crafts reaction.

Acetic acid esters and amide
Acetyl chloride is a reagent for the preparation of esters and amides of acetic acid, used in the derivatization of alcohols and amines.  One class of acetylation reactions are esterification, for example the reaction with ethanol to produce ethyl acetate and hydrogen chloride:
CH3COCl + HO-CH2-CH3  ->  CH3-COO-CH2-CH3 + HCl
Frequently such acylations are carried out in the presence of a base such as pyridine, triethylamine, or DMAP, which act as catalysts to help promote the reaction and as bases neutralize the resulting HCl. Such reactions will often proceed via ketene.

Friedel-Crafts acetylations
A second major class of acetylation reactions are the Friedel-Crafts reactions.

See also
Acetic acid
Acetyl bromide
Acetyl fluoride
Acetyl iodide

References

External links

Acyl chlorides
Acetylating agents
Organic compounds with 2 carbon atoms